Langepas (Khanty:  Лӑңкипос, Lăŋkipos) is a town in Khanty-Mansi Autonomous Okrug, Russia. Population:

Geography

History
Langepas means "squirrel land" in the Khanty language. It was established in 1980 and granted town status in 1985.. It was initially built as a settlement for the staff of the Lokosovo gas processing plant.

Administrative and municipal status
Within the framework of administrative divisions, it is incorporated as the town of okrug significance of Langepas—an administrative unit with the status equal to that of the districts. As a municipal division, the town of okrug significance of Langepas is incorporated as Langepas Urban Okrug.

Economy
Economy of the town is based on oil and natural gas extraction as initially it was founded by Lukoil. The oil company was named after the three western Siberian companies, which merged to form Lukoil: Langepasneftegaz, Urayneftegaz, and Kogalymneftegaz.

References

Notes

Sources

External links
Official website of Langepas 
 Informational website of Langepas

Cities and towns in Khanty-Mansi Autonomous Okrug
Populated places on the Ob River